Karlad Lake is located in Thariode, Wayanad. It is the third largest fresh water lake in Kerala and second largest lake in Wayanad after Pookode Lake. The lake is 3 km away from Banasura Sagar Dam.

Attractions

Wayanad Adventure Camp on the lake is administered by D.T.P.C (District Tourism Promotion Council) Wayanad.

Ziplining, boating, kayaking, rock climbing, and Zorbing are among the tourist attractions. There is also a handicrafts and spices emporium. Corporate events are also held here along with tents and cottages for visitors.

Gallery

References 

Lakes of Kerala
Geography of Wayanad district
Tourist attractions in Wayanad district